James Deiparine (born 4 January 1993) is a Filipino swimmer. He competed in the men's 50 metre breaststroke event at the 2017 World Aquatics Championships.

References

1993 births
Living people
Filipino male swimmers
Place of birth missing (living people)
Southeast Asian Games medalists in swimming
Southeast Asian Games silver medalists for the Philippines
Competitors at the 2017 Southeast Asian Games
Southeast Asian Games gold medalists for the Philippines
Competitors at the 2019 Southeast Asian Games
Male breaststroke swimmers
20th-century Filipino people
21st-century Filipino people